Polygamous marriages may not be performed in the United Kingdom, and if a polygamous marriage is performed, the already-married person may be guilty of the crime of bigamy under section 11 of the Matrimonial Causes Act 1973.

England and Wales
Bigamy is a statutory offence in England and Wales. It is committed by a person who, being married to another person, goes through a ceremony capable of producing a valid marriage with a third person. The offence is created by section 57 of the Offences against the Person Act 1861:

This section replaced section 22 of the Offences against the Person Act 1828 for England and Wales, which replaced section 1 of the Bigamy Act 1603 (1 Jac 1 c 11). This section replaces section 26 of the Act 10 Geo. 4 c. 34 for Northern Ireland.

Subsequent case law has allowed exceptions for cases where the defendant believes on reasonable grounds that their first spouse is dead or that the marriage has been dissolved.

Bigamy is triable either way. A person guilty of bigamy is liable, on conviction on indictment, to imprisonment for a term not exceeding seven years, or on summary conviction to imprisonment for a term not exceeding six months, or to a fine not exceeding the prescribed sum, or to both.

Relevant cases are:
 R v Crowhurst [1979] Crim. L.R. 399
 R v Smith 1994 15 Cr App R (S) 407
 R v Cairns [1997] 1 Cr App R (S)
 R v Bajlu Islam Khan, Karen Mary Kennedy [2004] EWCA Crim. 3316
 R v Trigger Alan, Mike Seed and Philip Stark [2007] EWCA 254, [2007] 2 Cr. App. R. (s) 69
 R v Arthur William Ballard [2007] 2 Cr. App. R. (S) 94

There have been reports of Muslims practicing polygamy in the UK.

Scotland

Bigamy was a common law offence in Scotland prior to the passing of the Marriage and Civil Partnership (Scotland) Act 2014 when it became a statutory offence. It is an offence for a person to enter into a marriage or civil partnership while either party knows that they, or the other party, is married to or in a civil partnership with another person. The offence is punishable with up to 2 years in prison or a fine (or both).

Northern Ireland 

In Northern Ireland, a person guilty of bigamy is liable, on conviction on indictment, to imprisonment for a term not exceeding seven years, or on summary conviction to imprisonment for a term not exceeding twelve months, or to a fine not exceeding the prescribed sum, or to both.

See also 
Marriage in the United Kingdom
Polygamy

References 

United Kingdom
Immigration to the United Kingdom
Marriage in the United Kingdom